The Bay City Beavers were a Southern Michigan League baseball team based in Bay City, Michigan, United States that existed from 1913 to 1915. Future major leaguer Joe Harris played for them in 1913 and 1914. Cecil Coombs played for them in 1914 as well. No known major league baseball players played for them in 1915.

References

Baseball teams established in 1913
Defunct minor league baseball teams
Sports in Bay City, Michigan
Defunct baseball teams in Michigan
Professional baseball teams in Michigan
1913 establishments in Michigan
Baseball teams disestablished in 1915
Southern Michigan League teams